Central, Your Partner In Home Improvement was a Canadian home improvement retailer. It operated seven locations in Nova Scotia, Canada. The first store opened in Antigonish in 1976 under the name S&D Smith Central Supplies Limited. The stores in both Sydney and Antigonish were also replaced with new . stores in 2001 and 2005 respectively. The former Antigonish store has been converted into the distribution centre for the chain.

From the mid-1990s until 2004, the store was known as Central Home Improvement Warehouse. The stores were renamed to Kent Building Supplies on January 1, 2017.

Locations
Antigonish
Guysborough
Inverness
New Glasgow
Port Hawkesbury 
Sydney
Windsor

External links
 Official website

Companies based in Nova Scotia
Hardware stores of Canada
Retail companies established in 1976
1976 establishments in Nova Scotia